Hygor Cléber Garcia Silva (born 13 August 1992), simply known as Hygor, is a Brazilian footballer who plays  as a forward for Ceará.

Career statistics

References

External links

1992 births
Living people
Brazilian footballers
Brazilian expatriate footballers
Association football forwards
Clube Atlético Penapolense players
Suwon Samsung Bluewings players
Esporte Clube Noroeste players
Associação Ferroviária de Esportes players
Ivinhema Futebol Clube players
Barretos Esporte Clube players
Sport Club do Recife players
Esporte Clube Juventude players
Paysandu Sport Club players
Criciúma Esporte Clube players
Ceará Sporting Club players
Campeonato Brasileiro Série A players
Campeonato Brasileiro Série B players
Campeonato Brasileiro Série C players
Campeonato Brasileiro Série D players
K League 1 players
Brazilian expatriate sportspeople in South Korea
Expatriate footballers in South Korea